
Gmina Ryn is an urban-rural gmina (administrative district) in Giżycko County, Warmian-Masurian Voivodeship, in northern Poland.

Villages
Apart from the town of Ryn, Gmina Ryn contains the villages and settlements of Bachorza, Canki, Głąbowo, Grzybowo, Hermanowa Wola, Jeziorko, Knis, Knis-Podewsie, Kronowo, Krzyżany, Ławki, Ławki PGR, Mioduńskie, Mleczkowo, Monetki, Mrówki, Orło, Prażmowo, Rybical, Ryński Dwór, Ryńskie Pole, Siejkowo, Skop, Skorupki, Słabowo, Stara Rudówka, Sterławki Wielkie, Szymonka, Tros, Wejdyki and Zielony Lasek.

Neighbouring gminas
Gmina Ryn is bordered by the gminas of Giżycko, Kętrzyn, Mikołajki, Miłki and Mrągowo.

References
Polish official population figures 2006

Ryn
Giżycko County